Emily Stone (often credited as Em Stone; born July 22, 1978) is an American comic book illustrator most known for artwork on Devil’s Due Publishing's HACK/Slash series.

Early life
Born and raised in Potts Camp, Mississippi, Emily's introduction to the sequential narrative was through Spider-Man comics featured in Electric Company Magazine. She received a Master's Degree in Fine Arts from the sequential art program at Savannah College of Art and Design.  She had received her Bachelor's degree from Mississippi State University in Computer Science.

Thomas Mitchell "Coach" Stone, a former basketball coach from Potts Camp, Mississippi, who miraculously guided his small-town, rural team to the overall State Championship in 1961, is Stone's grandfather.

Career
Although most well known for her artwork on the story of Cassie Hack and her partner Vlad in Devil’s Due Publishing's HACK/Slash series, Stone's career in illustration has included a variety of other projects. This includes inking, penciling, or coloring The Ride (published by Image Comics), Jim Henson's comic Return to Labyrinth, and G.I. Joe comics/merchandise.  She was also involved in the artwork for 160-page original graphic novel anthology, Lloyd Kaufman Presents the Toxic Avenger and Other Tromatic Tales.

Through HACK/Slash storylines, Stone has drawn numerous pop-culture characters including Reanimator's Herbert West, the Suicide Girls, Milk & Cheese among others. In addition, Stone has also illustrated a cover for Chucky from the Child's Play miniseries and artwork for Batgirl.

Work

2007-2008

As a penciler
 Hack/Slash (ongoing monthly series)

2006
 Pencils, inks and toning: The Ride: Savannah (chapter 3)

2006

As an inker
 G.I. Joe Sigma 6 issue 3 (Feb '06) interior art
 G.I. Joe Sigma 6 issue 5 (Apr '06) cover art
 Jim Henson's Return to Labyrinth, Vol. 1

References

External links
 Em Stone's illustration portfolio

American female comics artists
Living people
1978 births